Agustín José Bernaus y Serra (16 August 1863 in Artesa de Segre – 18 January 1930) was a Spanish clergyman and bishop for the Roman Catholic Diocese of Bluefields. He became ordained in 1889. 

He was appointed Vicar Apostolic of Guam (now Agaña) and Titular Bishop of Milopotamos in May 1913, and Vicar Apostolic of Bluefields in Nicaragua in September 1913. 

He died on 18 January 1930, at the age of 66.

References

Spanish Roman Catholic bishops
1863 births
1930 deaths
19th-century Roman Catholic bishops in Nicaragua
20th-century Roman Catholic bishops in Nicaragua
Roman Catholic bishops of Bluefields
Roman Catholic bishops of Agaña
Roman Catholic titular bishops